Fenwick Island is a coastal resort town in Sussex County, Delaware, United States. According to 2020 census figures, the population of the town is 355, a 2.6% decrease over the last decade. It is part of the Salisbury, Maryland-Delaware Metropolitan Statistical Area. The town is located on Fenwick Island, a barrier spit.

Fenwick Island and its neighbors to the north, Bethany Beach and South Bethany, are popularly known as "The Quiet Resorts". This is in contrast to the wild atmosphere of Dewey Beach and the cosmopolitan bustle of Rehoboth Beach. Fenwick Island, however, is somewhat less "quiet" than "the Bethanies" because it is immediately across the state line from Ocean City, Maryland, which has a reputation as a lively vacation resort.

Named after Thomas Fenwick, a planter from England who settled in Maryland, Fenwick Island lay in the part of Delaware which was claimed by Lord Baltimore and his heirs during the Penn-Baltimore border dispute.

Contrary to popular belief, the town does not sit on a barrier island but on a narrow peninsula which resembles a barrier island (unless one considers a narrow man-made boat canal well inland that connects White Creek to Little Assawoman Bay).  The narrow strip of land separates the Atlantic Ocean from Little Assawoman Bay.  Ocean City, Maryland, occupies the southern tip of this peninsula.

Local legend has it that Cedar Island in Little Assawoman Bay was a spot for pirates to bury treasure. Regardless of the truth of the legend, the Delaware coastal area was well known as a place for pirates to hide from the law.  Cedar Island has just about washed under the bay, as Seal Island did around 2010.

The town was an unincorporated area between South Bethany and Ocean City, Maryland, until July 1953, when the Delaware General Assembly passed an act to incorporate the town. Local sentiment demanded incorporation to prevent the relentless high-rise development of Ocean City from creeping north into Fenwick Island.

Fenwick Island's population was 48 in 1960.

Geography
Fenwick Island is located at  (38.4623346, –75.0512922).

Climate
The climate in this area is characterized by hot, humid summers and generally mild to cool winters. According to the Köppen Climate Classification system, Fenwick Island has a humid subtropical climate, abbreviated Cfa on climate maps.

Infrastructure

Transportation

Delaware Route 1 (Coastal Highway), which has its southern terminus at the Maryland border in Fenwick Island, serves as the main north–south road in the town, heading north along the coast toward Bethany Beach and Rehoboth Beach. Coastal Highway crosses the Maryland border and heads south through Ocean City as Maryland Route 528. Delaware Route 54 (Lighthouse Road) begins at DE 1 in Fenwick Island a block north of the state line and heads west toward Selbyville to provide access from inland areas. Between May 15 and September 15, parking permits are required along all streets in Fenwick Island.

DART First State provides bus service to Fenwick Island in the summer months along Beach Bus Route 208, which heads north to the Rehoboth Beach Park and Ride to connect to other Beach Bus routes and the Route 305 bus from Wilmington and south to the 144th Street Transit Center in Ocean City, Maryland, a short distance south of the state line to connect to Ocean City Transportation's Coastal Highway Beach Bus.

Utilities
Delmarva Power, a subsidiary of Exelon, provides electricity to Fenwick Island. Chesapeake Utilities provides natural gas to the town. Artesian Water Company, a subsidiary of Artesian Resources, provides water to Fenwick Island. Sussex County operates the Fenwick Island Sanitary Sewer District, which provides sewer service to the town. Cable and internet service in Fenwick Island is provided by Xfinity. Trash and recycling collection in Fenwick Island is provided under contract by Waste Industries.

Demographics

As of the census of 2000, there were 342 people, 178 households, and 126 families residing in the town. The racial makeup of the town was 99.42% White, and 0.58% from two or more races. Hispanic or Latino of any race were 2.63% of the population.

There were 178 households, out of which 5.6% had children under the age of 18 living with them, 67.4% were married couples living together, 2.8% had a female householder with no husband present, and 28.7% were non-families. 26.4% of all households were made up of individuals, and 15.7% had someone living alone who was 65 years of age or older. The average household size was 1.92 and the average family size was 2.25.

In the town, the population was spread out, with 6.1% under the age of 18, 2.6% from 18 to 24, 11.1% from 25 to 44, 40.6% from 45 to 64, and 39.5% who were 65 years of age or older. The median age was 61 years. For every 100 females, there were 89.0 males. For every 100 females age 18 and over, there were 86.6 males.

The median income for a household in the town was $58,333, and the median income for a family was $68,750. Males had a median income of $46,607 versus $48,750 for females. The per capita income for the town was $44,415. About 3.3% of families and 8.5% of the population were below the poverty line, including none of those under age 18 and 7.1% of those age 65 or over.

Education
Residents are served by the Indian River School District.

Notable people 

 Deborah Birx, physician, diplomat, White House Coronavirus Task Force coordinator

See also
Transpeninsular Line
Delmarva Peninsula
Delaware Seashore State Park
Fenwick Island Light
Fenwick Island State Park

References

External links

Town of Fenwick Island - Official Site
Fenwick Island, DE Information

Beaches of Delaware
Seaside resorts in Delaware
Towns in Sussex County, Delaware
Towns in Delaware
Salisbury metropolitan area
Populated coastal places in Delaware